Dębica railway station is a railway station in Dębica (Subcarpathia), Poland. As of 2022, it is served by Polregio and PKP Intercity (EIP, InterCity, and TLK services).

Train services

The following services serve the station:

EuroCity services (EC) (EC 95 by DB) (IC by PKP) Berlin - Frankfurt (Oder) - Rzepin - Wrocław – Katowice – Kraków – Rzeszów – Przemyśl
Express Intercity Premium services (EIP) Gdynia - Warsaw - Kraków - Rzeszów
Intercity services (IC) Zielona Góra - Wrocław - Opele - Częstochowa - Kraków - Rzeszów - Przemyśl
Intercity services (IC) Ustka - Koszalin - Poznań - Wrocław - Katowice - Kraków - Rzeszów - Przemyśl
Regional services (PR) Katowice — Kraków — Dębica 
Regional services (PR) Tarnów - Dębica - Rzeszów
Regional services (PR) Kraków - Bochnia - Tarnów - Dębica - Rzeszów
Regional services (PR) Tarnów - Dębica - Rzeszów - Jarosław - Przemyśl
Regional services (PR) Dębica - Mielec
Regional services (PR) Dębica - Mielec - Padew
Regional services (PKA) Dębica - Rzeszów

References 

Station article at koleo.pl

Railway stations served by Przewozy Regionalne InterRegio
Railway stations in Poland opened in 1856